MicroUnity Systems Engineering, Inc. was a private company located in Los Altos, California and an early developer of broadband microprocessor technologies licensed widely across digital media industries.

Founders and Funding
MicroUnity was founded in 1988 by John Moussouris, a physicist trained at Harvard University and as a Rhodes Scholar at Oxford University who had co-founded MIPS Computer Systems. The Chief Architect was Craig Hansen, who used to be Chief Architect at MIPS and NeXT. An early investor was Moussouris’ Harvard classmate William Randolph Hearst III, the publishing and media executive who became a partner at venture firm Kleiner Perkins. In the early 1990s, MicroUnity was backed by over $100 million from companies like Hewlett-Packard, Microsoft, Motorola, and telecommunications leaders like Time Warner and John Malone at Tele-Communications Inc.

Early media processing technology
The company’s main focus was a programmable media processor chip and associated software aimed at set-top boxes and other systems.

MicroUnity kept its product development secret until 1995. In early 1996, the company published details at COMPCON  of its media processor hardware and software designs. The technology processed media data of various types and width in a 128-bit data path in parallel.

Manufacturing innovations
MicroUnity developed its first designs in BiCMOS at a time when Intel Pentium Pro and Sun Microsystems SPARC were designed in BiCMOS.  Company patents describe technologies intended for integration of analog media interfaces with digital circuits.

Notes

External links
MicroUnity's corporate website

1988 establishments in California
American companies established in 1988
Companies based in Santa Clara, California
Computer companies established in 1988
Defunct computer companies of the United States
Defunct computer hardware companies
Electronics companies established in 1988
Electronics companies of the United States